Misjudged People (German: Verkannte Menschen) is a 1932 German documentary film that features the German deaf community. It was produced by the Reich Union of the Deaf (Reichsverband der Gehörlosen Deutschlands) of Germany to give the German public a positive perception of the capabilities of deaf people. It was banned by the Nazis in 1934 to avoid promoting that perception.

Synopsis

The documentary has two parts, with the first part focused on education and the second on deaf people as actively contributing German citizens.

Production

The organization Reich Union of the Deaf of Germany (Reichsverband der Gehörlosen Deutschlands, ReGeDe) was formed in 1927 from multiple regional associations. ReGeDe wanted to create a more positive perception of deaf people for the rest of the German public, so they produced a documentary based on a script written by Wilhelm Ballier, who was deaf and a Nazi sympathizer.

Release

The film was released in 1932, but the Nazis did not want the positive perception promoted, so Joseph Goebbels, the minister of propaganda, banned it in 1934.

Reception

Carol Poore, writing in Disability in Twentieth-Century German Culture, said that Misjudged People "is an important document about the German deaf community" in the Weimar Republic's last years.

The Encyclopedia of Disability said that Misjudged People was an example of Deaf Europeans trying "to counter popular impressions of deaf people as inferior" by instead representing themselves "to hearing society as healthy, vigorous, and thoroughly modern individuals".

See also

 List of films featuring the deaf and hard of hearing

References

External links
Verkannte Menschen filmportal.de
Gehörlose in der NS-Zeit (in German) Deutscher Gehörlosen-Bund 2013
Verkannte Menschen (in German) Landesverband der Gehörlosen Hessen 2009

German documentary films
German black-and-white films
1932 documentary films
1932 films
Deafness in Germany
1930s German films